Renato "Rene" Colusso (born 19 August 1956 in Sydney, Australia) is an Australian former association football player.

Playing career

Club career
Colusso played his early football for Marconi Stallions in the New South Wales State League.

In 1975, he moved to Italy where he initially played youth team football for Torino.

He then went on to play for Ivrea, becoming the first Australian to play professional football in Italy.

He moved to Pisa for the 1976/1977 season.

In 1977, he transferred to Arezzo where he played several seasons.

He later played for Alessandria, Akragas Calcio and Castelfiorentino.

International career
In 1975, he made his only full international appearance for Australia in a match against China.

Management career
Colusso had stints as an assistant manager at Reggina and Avellino.

References

1956 births
Soccer players from Sydney
Australian expatriate soccer players
Australia international soccer players
S.S. Arezzo players
Pisa S.C. players
A.S.D. Calcio Ivrea players
U.S. Alessandria Calcio 1912 players
Expatriate footballers in Italy
Living people
Association football forwards
Australian soccer players